Torjus Værland (1868-1954) was the Norwegian Minister of Social Affairs 1928–1931.

1868 births
1954 deaths
Government ministers of Norway